Happiness is a Japanese pop girl group formed and managed by LDH since 2008 and signed to the record label Rhythm Zone. They are a dance and vocal unit of collective girl group E-girls alongside Dream and Flower. The group consists of two vocalists and three performers.

History

Pre-debut and indie debut
Happiness first appeared during Exile's 2008 Live Tour as backup dancers, at the time being a five-member unit consisting of Miyuu, Mimu, Karen, Sayaka, and Kaede. On April 10, 2009, it was announced that LDH would hold auditions to recruit vocalists for the new girlgroup, specifically aiming at girls aged 12–14. Yurino was then added to the group after an LDH Audition before the group was set to debut. They released their debut DVD single, "Happy Talk", on October 21, 2009. It was also used as the theme song for Japanese brand Mister Donuts.

2009-2012: Major label, first album Happy Time and E-girls formation 
Mayu Sugieda was added to the group and announced on December 25, 2009, before the group made their major debut on February 9, 2011 with the release of their first major label single, "Kiss Me". Four days before their debut, the group held a live event to promote the upcoming release of their first single that attracted about 1000 spectators. The group released their 2nd single "Friends" on April 27 in the same year. Two days later, they held their first solo show at SHIBUYA-AX in Tokyo. For the release of their 3rd single  "Wish" on August 17, Happiness held their first surprise live event in front of SHIBUYA 109 in Tokyo, proving their popularity among teenage girls. Mimu was absent from the group's promotions after going on hiatus in December 2011, including their 4th single "We Can Fly", before leaving the group in October 2012, citing she wanted to focus on her studies.

In November 2011, Happiness was confirmed to be joining sister groups Dream and Flower in the collective group E-girls. Member Mayu also went on a hiatus in August 2012 to undergo medical treatment after being diagnosed with infectious mononucleosis.

On June 6, 2012, it was announced that Happiness would release their first album titled Happy Time on June 20. The track-list of the album included a cover of SPEED's "Body & Soul".

2013-2014: Addition of Anna and Ruri, competition with Flower and Mayu's departure 
E-girls members Anna Suda and Ruri Kawamoto joined the group in May 2013 as a dancer and vocalist respectively, and the group released their 5th single, "Sunshine Dream: Ichido Kiri no Natsu". It was released on the same day as Flower's 5th single ""Taiyou to Himawari" (太陽と向日葵; Sun and Sunflower) to initiate a competition between the two groups. The winner of the competition would have one of their songs feature as a B-side on a future E-girls' single. Two weeks after the release, it was revealed via Exile's TV show Shuukan EXILE, that Happiness lost the battle by 2 points against 3 of Flower. As a reward, Flower's song "Hatsukoi" (初恋; First Love) was included in E-girls' single "Gomennasai no Kissing You".

Miyuu was announced as the new leader of the group, replacing Mimu on January 30, 2014. Mayu Sugieda, after months of hiatus, left both Happiness and E-girls on April 7, 2014. Happiness continued to promote with E-girls, releasing their 6th single, "Juicy Love", on May 28, 2014 and their 7th single, "Seek A Light", on November 19, 2014, between E-girls singles. These singles were also the first ones after Happiness' label transfer from Nayutawave to Avex' Rhythm Zone.

2015-2016: Second studio album GIRLZ N' EFFECT and first tour 
Happiness announced the release of their 8th single, "Holiday" on August 28, 2015, set to be released on October 14. It served as a turning point in Happiness' sound and concept, marking the start of a more mature, energetic and colorful image of the group. The title track was produced by T.Kura, who had worked with artists such as Exile and Namie Amuro before. Furthermore, NIGO, creator of fashion brands Bathing Ape and Human Made, was in charge of the art and visual direction for the promotional photo shoots for this single. The T-shirts worn by the Happiness members in their artist photos and in the music video were also co-designed by NIGO and Naoto, member of Exile/Sandaime J Soul Brothers/Honest Boyz.

On February 3, 2016, Happiness released their 9th single, "Sexy Young Beautiful". The release is a unique one meant to display the group's singing, rapping, and dancing ability. The covers for the single were designed by NIGO too. On May 28 in the same year, it was announced that Happiness would release the song "Always" as the theme song for the live action adaptation of the manga Itazura na Kiss ~ THE MOVIE ~ Part 1 Highschool-hen (イタズラなKiss～THE MOVIE～ Part1ハイスクール編; Mischievous Kiss~ THE MOVIE ~ Part 1 High School Edition) that would be released in November. On August 11, 2016, it was revealed on E-girls' last day of their third tour E-girls LIVE TOUR 2016 "E.G. SMILE", that Happiness will be releasing their second album GIRLZ N' EFFECT on October 12, 2016. They also announced the group's first solo tour Happiness LIVE TOUR 2016 GIRLZ N' EFFECT that would go from November 9 until December 20, 2016.

2017-present: Single albums and E.G.family's first tour 
The group released their 10th single "REWIND" on February 8, 2017, the day before the 6th anniversary of their debut. On March 10, 2017, it was announced that Miyuu would undergo surgery on her left knee due to a lateral meniscus injury and halt her activities until she was fully rehabilitated. On August 27 in the same year, the group participated on the annual festival a-nation, being their first time participating in it. The group released their 11th single "GOLD" on September 10, 2017. The single ranked #1 on Oricon's weekly singles chart on the following week, being their first #1 single.

After over a year of hiatus, the group released their first digital single "POWER GIRLS" On January 16, 2019. The group participated in E.G.family's first tour E.G.POWER 2019 ~POWER to the DOME~ that went from February 22 to May 25, 2019. On March 1, it was announced that Ruri, Kaede and Sayaka were appointed as ambassadors for DeNA's YOKOHAMA GIRLS☆FESTIVAL 2019 Supported by ありあけ 横濱ハーバー from May 31 to June 2. For this occasion, Ruri sang the national anthem of Japan and Kaede threw the opening pitch for the baseball game on the first day of the festival. On June 12, 2019, the group released "POWER GIRLS" as their twelfth single. On September 11 in the same year, Happiness released their 13th single "Chao Chao". The music video for the title track was shot at Pacific Park on the Santa Monica Pier and in the Bradbury Building in Los Angeles. The release of the new single was accompanied by a row of promotional live-events across Japan.

During the announcement of E-girls' plan to dissolve at the end of 2020 on December 22, 2019, it was revealed that Happiness would stay as they are and will work with 88rising for global expansion in the future.

On December 15, 2020, members Yurino and Anna Suda announced they would be leaving LDH, therefore also graduating from Happiness. In 2022 members Sayaka, Ruri, Miyuu, and Kaede announced that they were forming the group SG5, or Sailor Guardians 5, with iScream's Rui. They have not announced whether they would graduate from Happiness or perform in both groups.

Members

Current members

Former members

Timeline

Discography

Albums

Singles

Other charted songs

Participating works

Tie-up

Tours

As a lead artist

As a participating group

Filmography

Music videos

Commercials

Notes

References

External links
 
 

Japanese girl groups
Musical groups established in 2008
2009 establishments in Japan
LDH (company) artists